Charles Thomas House, also known as Fairview, is a historic home located in West Whiteland Township, Chester County, Pennsylvania. The house was designed by noted Philadelphia architect Addison Hutton (1834–1916) and built in 1877–1878.   The original house was a two-story, five bay rectangular brick dwelling faced with blue limestone in a Late Gothic Revival style.  It has a service wing and the pentagonal library wing was added in 1896.

It was listed on the National Register of Historic Places in 1984.

References

Houses on the National Register of Historic Places in Pennsylvania
Gothic Revival architecture in Pennsylvania
Houses completed in 1896
Houses in Chester County, Pennsylvania
National Register of Historic Places in Chester County, Pennsylvania